Lubumbashi International Airport  is an airport serving Lubumbashi, Democratic Republic of the Congo.

History
Lubumbashi International Airport was founded in colonial times as the Elisabethville Airport. It was also known as Luano Airport. This airport played a high-profile role during the Katanga war. After it was seized by the United Nations Force in the Congo (ONUC) troops, the airport was used as a base against the secessionist government.

Airlines and destinations

Passenger

Cargo

Accidents and incidents
In December 2001, Air Katanga Douglas C-53-DO  ZS-OJD was written off in a landing accident at Lubumbashi International Airport after a delivery flight that originated in South Africa.
On September 15, 1961, a Katangese Air Force Fouga CM.170 Magister dropped two 100 lb. bombs on the airport, one of which made a direct hit on a DC-4-1009 belonging to Air Katanga with the registration OO-ADN. There were no casualties, but the aircraft was written off.

See also
Transport in the Democratic Republic of the Congo
List of airports in the Democratic Republic of the Congo

References

External links

Buildings and structures in Lubumbashi
Airports in Haut-Katanga Province
Airfields of the United States Army Air Forces Air Transport Command in Central and South Africa
Airfields of the United States Army Air Forces
World War II airfields in the Belgian Congo